Fordyce may refer to:

People

Given name
 Fordyce L. Laflin (1824–1887), New York businessman and politician
 Fordyce R. Melvin (1832–1915), Wisconsin businessman and politician

Surname
 Alexander Fordyce (died 1789), Scottish banker
 Brook Fordyce (born 1970), U.S. professional baseball player
 Bruce Fordyce (born 1955), South African long-distance runner
 Daryl Fordyce (born 1987), British footballer
 David Fordyce (1711–1751), Scottish philosopher
 Douglas Fordyce (born 1990), Men's Pairs world championship gold medal winning acrobatic gymnast, member of Spelbound
 George Fordyce (1736–1802), Scottish physician
 James Fordyce (1720–1796), Scottish clergyman, compiler and primary author of Fordyce's Sermons
 John Fordyce (priest) (died 1751), Church of England priest ordained in Pembrokeshire, Wales who transferred to South Carolina
 John Fordyce (politician) (1735–1809), Member of Parliament for New Romney and for Berwick-Upon-Tweed
 John Fordyce (missionary) (1819–1902), Scottish missionary
 John Addison Fordyce (1858–1925), American dermatologist
 Michael W. Fordyce (1944–2011), happiness researcher
 Samuel W. Fordyce (1840–1919), U.S. railroad executive
 Tom Fordyce (born 1973), British journalist
 Sir William Fordyce (1724–1792), Scottish physician
 William Dingwall Fordyce (1836–1875), Scottish Liberal politician

Places
 Fordyce, Arkansas, USA
 Fordyce, Nebraska, USA
 Fordyce, Aberdeenshire, Scotland
 Fordyce Creek Trail, California, USA

Other
 Fordyce's spot
 Fordyce's disease
 Fox–Fordyce disease